Sissel Juul Holm (April 6, 1937 – July 19, 1987) was a Norwegian actress.

Juul made her film debut in 1961 in Line (The Passionate Demons), and she then appeared in Et øye på hver finger (1961) and Stompa, selvfølgelig! (1963). She also performed at the Edderkoppen Theater.

From 1963 until her death she was married to the actor Sverre Holm.

Filmography
1961: Line as Hanne
1961: Et øye på hver finger as Minnie, a waitress
1963: Stompa, selvfølgelig! as Margaret, Tørrdal's sister

References

External links
 
 Sissel Juul at Filmfront

1937 births
1987 deaths
20th-century Norwegian actresses
Actresses from Oslo